Belouizdad may refer to:

Belouizdad, Algiers, a quarter of Algiers, Algiers Province, Algeria
CR Belouizdad, a professional football club in the Mohamed Belouizdad district, Algiers

People
Amina Belouizdad (1932–2015), first female presenter on Algerian television
Islam Belouizdad (born 1987), real name of Algerian-French artist Hayce Lemsi
Mohamed Belouizdad (1924–1952), Algerian militant and politician